Club Deportivo Cazalegas - Ebora Formación is a Spanish football team located in Cazalegas, Toledo, in the autonomous community of Castilla–La Mancha. Founded in 2004, they play in Primera Autonómica Preferente de Castilla-La Mancha – Group 2, holding home matches at Ciudad Deportiva Ebora Formación with a capacity of 1,000 spectators.

Season to season

References

External links
 
Soccerway team profile

Football clubs in Castilla–La Mancha
Association football clubs established in 2004
2004 establishments in Spain